Shevrin D. Jones (born October 12, 1983) is an American politician from the state of Florida. He was elected to the Florida State Senate in 2020 to represent the 35th District. He previously was a Democratic member of the Florida House of Representatives, representing the 101st District, which included southeastern Broward County since 2012.

Jones is the first gay person and first LGBT Black person elected to the Florida Legislature. Term-limited from his position, he ran for the Florida Senate in a crowded primary for District 35 facing no Republican opposition in the general election.

Personal life

Jones was born in Miami Gardens, Florida. He attended Florida A&M University, where he graduated with a Bachelor of Science degree in biochemistry and molecular biology in 2006. After receiving this degree, he returned to South Florida, where he taught Advanced Placement Chemistry in Broward County Public Schools, and then worked as a Biology instructor at Florida Atlantic University High School. In 2017 Jones obtained a Master of Education from Florida Atlantic University. In 2022, he earned a PhD in Educational Leadership from the same institution.

In 2010, he ran for a seat on the Broward County Commission in District 8, running against Barbara Sharief and Angelo Castillo. Jones attacked Sharief and Castillo in a mailer over the fact that they would have to resign their positions in local government if they were elected, declaring, "Both of my opponents are incumbent politicians who have abandoned their oath to serve us for the full term for which they campaigned. Now the taxpayers of Pembroke Pines and Miramar will have to pay thousands more for special elections needed to replace them. That's just wrong." Jones came in third place, receiving 17% of the vote to Sharief's 62% and Castillo's 21%.

In early October 2016, Jones abruptly lost the ability to walk after he ruptured part of his lower spinal cord during an accident at the gym, causing a nerve injury that his doctors told him should have left him paralyzed. After emergency surgery, a follow-up procedure and rigorous physical therapy, Jones was able to walk again after seven weeks with assistance from a cane.

In 2018, Jones came out as gay, thus becoming the first LGBT black person to serve in the Florida Legislature.

Honors and awards 

Top 40 Under 40 Most Powerful in South Florida

Senator Jones served on President Barack Obama’s College Promise Task Force

Recently appointed to President Biden’s Board of Advisors on Historically Black Colleges and Universities (HBCUs)

Florida Young Democrat of the Year

Top 30 Under 30 Successful Black Men

Young Elected Officials Network, Leadership Florida Connect - Class 32

Leadership Broward Class 27

Millennial Action Project’s Florida Future Caucus

Broward Parent Teachers Association’s Legislator of the Year

Congressional Political Institute Honoree

ICABA’s 100 Most Accomplished Caribbean Americans

Gold Coast Magazine’s “Top 40 under 40,”

Legacy Magazine’s South Florida's “50 Most Powerful and Influential Black Leaders”

Florida House of Representatives

In 2012, after the Florida House of Representatives districts were redrawn, Jones opted to run in the newly created 101st District, which encompassed the cities of Hollywood, Miramar, Pembroke Park, Pembroke Pines and West Park. He initially was set to face Pembroke Park Mayor Ashira Mohammed and Hollywood City Commissioner Beam Furr in the Democratic primary, but both Mohammed and Furr dropped out.

As such, Jones won election to the House unopposed in both the primary and general elections. Jones subsequently ran unopposed and was re-elected every two years until 2020 when he ran for Florida Senate District 35 due to term limits.

Serving in the Florida House of Representatives from 2012 - 2020, Jones championed meaningful bipartisan legislation, including two consecutive bills to secure dignity for incarcerated women; statewide expansion of a clean syringe exchange program; safety and oversight for athletic coaches for youth athletic teams; and ensuring transparency and accountability via State-wide police body cameras. Jones was the Florida House of Representatives Democratic Deputy Whip from 2014 - 2018.

Florida Senate 

In 2020, Shevrin Jones ran in a crowded, competitive and closely watched primary race to replace term-limited Senator Oscar Braynon in Florida Senate District 35 to represent portions of Miami-Dade and Broward counties.

Jones beat 6 candidates with a comfortable margin of more than 27 percentage points over the closest challenger, former State Senator Daphne Campbell. Jones won the State Senate seat over three Tallahassee veterans — Campbell, Rep. Barbara Watson and former Rep. Cynthia Stafford — as well as Miami Gardens Councilman Erhabor Ighodaro and retired firefighter Wilbur Harbin. Jones also raised more money than all his opponents combined while developing a national profile of his own. After he and his family were diagnosed with COVID-19 in July 2020, Jones took to major news networks like CNN and MSNBC as well as local media to criticize the state’s contact tracing program and discuss the state’s response to the pandemic.

The Florida Senate District 35 race was also notable because Jones’s opponents utilized fake Barack Obama robo-calls and some targeted Jones for his sexuality in an attempt to connect with religious voters. At a February 2020 campaign event, then candidate Erhabor Ighodaro said he was the best option for voters because “There is an image that God says a marriage should look like, that families should look like. And that’s what we’re gonna fight for.” Jones and his campaign became victims of homophobic robo-texts stemming from a ripped off version of a Miami Herald story about his attempt to donate plasma after recovering from COVID-19. The texts highlighted a Food and Drug Administration rule that men who have had sex with men in the last three months may not donate plasma, noting that Jones was turned away for donating because of his sexuality.

Florida Senate District 35 comprises portions of both Broward and Miami-Dade counties and includes the cities of Miami Gardens, Miramar, Opa-Locka, Pembroke Park, Pembroke Pines, West Park and unincorporated parts of Dade.

Following the 2020 Census and redistricting process, all State House, State Senate and Congressional seats in Florida are up for election in 2022. In early February 2022, the Legislature approved a redistricting plan for the Senate and House. In June 2022 Shevrin Jones qualified to run in the newly created Senate District 34, a heavily Democratic-leaning district which covers parts of Hialeah, Miami, Miami Beach, Miami Gardens, North Miami, North Miami Beach, Opa-locka and all of Bal Harbour, Bay Harbor Islands and North Bay Village.

References

External links
Florida House of Representatives - Shevrin D. Jones

1983 births
20th-century African-American people
21st-century African-American politicians
21st-century American politicians
African-American state legislators in Florida
Democratic Party Florida state senators
Gay politicians
LGBT African Americans
LGBT state legislators in Florida
Living people
Democratic Party members of the Florida House of Representatives
People from Hollywood, Florida